Song Xiaoli  (Chinese: 宋晓丽; born 21 July 1981) is a Chinese women's international footballer who plays as a midfielder. She is a member of the China women's national football team. She was part of the team at the 2007 FIFA Women's World Cup. On club level she plays for Jiangsu Shuntian in China.

Song married footballer Liu Tao on 5 November 2011.

International goals

References

1981 births
Living people
Chinese women's footballers
China women's international footballers
Place of birth missing (living people)
2007 FIFA Women's World Cup players
Women's association football midfielders